Bernard Vittu de Kerraoul (17 February 1936 – 24 July 2021) was a French writer, journalist, and columnist. He wrote numerous books, many of which were translated into English, Italian, and Spanish. His first book, Le poids des âmes, received the Prix International du Premier Roman in 1963. He was a member of the council of the bimonthly magazine Una voce.

Publications

Novels
Le Poids des âmes (1963)
Une si juste mort (1963)
Ombres sur Ardbury (1965)
Une grande conscience (1967)
La Carapace (1968)
Tissant sa toile (1969)
La Réconciliation (1971)
Le Temps de l'imposture (1972)

Other books
La Bretagne de la Rance au Trégor (1969)

References

1936 births
2021 deaths
French journalists
French columnists
Writers from Saint-Brieuc